James Edward Roe II (born August 23, 1973) is a former American football wide receiver and coach. He served as the offensive coordinator for the Baltimore Brigade of the Arena Football League (AFL) from 2017–2019. He played for the Baltimore Ravens of the National Football League (NFL) from 1996–1998.

High school career
James Roe attended Henrico High School in Henrico, Virginia where he was an All-State and All-Richmond Metro honoree in football and an All-Richmond Metro honoree in basketball. James was also an All-Capital District honoree in track and field. James Roe graduated from Henrico High School in 1991. (Reference VHSL Reference Guide & Richmond-Times Dispatch Archives)

College career
James Roe attended Norfolk State University from 1992 to 1995 and was voted All-CIAA three years in row. James Roe remains Norfolk State's all-time leading receiver, and holds three CIAA reception records for career reception yards, career reception touchdowns and single season reception TD.

National Football League career
Roe played for three years for the Baltimore Ravens, and ended his NFL career with 15 receptions for 239 yards (15.93 yards per rec. avg.), and a touchdown.

Arena Football League career
In nine Arena Football League seasons with the San Jose SaberCats, Roe caught 761 receptions for 9449 yards and 231 touchdowns. He received All-Ironman Team honors in 2003, 2004, and 2005, and was named Ironman of the Game in San Jose's ArenaBowl XVIII victory. After not starting the 2013 season with the team, Roe re-joined the SaberCats with two weeks remaining in the season. 

In 2017, he became the offensive coordinator of the Baltimore Brigade.

References

External links
Just Sports Stats
NFL stats
AFL stats
ArenaFootball.com bio

1973 births
Living people
Players of American football from Richmond, Virginia
American football wide receivers
American football linebackers
Norfolk State Spartans football players
Baltimore Ravens players
San Jose SaberCats players
Henrico High School alumni
Orlando Rage players
Baltimore Brigade coaches